The Diocese of Steubenville is a Latin Church ecclesiastical territory, or diocese, of the Catholic Church covering thirteen counties in southeastern Ohio in the United States.

The Diocese of Steubenville is a suffragan diocese in the ecclesiastical province of the metropolitan Archdiocese of Cincinnati. The current bishop of the diocese is Bishop Jeffrey Monforton. The seat for the diocese is Holy Name Cathedral in Steubenville.

History

1700 to 1940 
During the 17th century, present day Ohio was part of the French colony of New France. The Diocese of Quebec had jurisdiction over the region. In 1763, Ohio Country became part of the British Province of Quebec, forbidden from settlement by American colonists. After the American Revolution, the Ohio area became part of the new United States. For Catholics, Ohio was now under the jurisdiction of the Archdiocese of Baltimore, which then comprised the entire country.

In 1808, Pope Pius VII erected the Diocese of Bardstown in Kentucky, with jurisdiction over the new state of Ohio along with the other midwest states. Pope Pius VII on June 19, 1821, erected the Diocese of Cincinnati, taking the entire state of Ohio from the Diocese of Bardstown.

On March 3, 1868, Pope Pius IX erected the Diocese of Columbus, encompassing the portions of Ohio "...lying south of 40' and 41" and between the Ohio River on the East and the Scioto River on the West together with the Counties of Franklin, Delaware and Morrow."

1940 to 1990 
Pope Pius XII erected the Diocese of Steubenville on October 21, 1944, from thirteen counties (Carroll, Jefferson, Harrison, Guernsey, Belmont, Noble, Monroe, Morgan, Washington, Athens, Meigs, Gallia, and Lawrence) previously part of the Diocese of Columbus. The pope appointed Reverend Anthony Mussio of the Archdiocese of Cincinnati as the first bishop of Steubenville.

In 1958, Mussio joined with the other Catholic bishops of Ohio in opposing a so-called right to work amendment to the Ohio Constitution that would have outlawed mandatory union membership in unionized workplaces. As bishop, Mussio established 73 parishes and 20 missions, the College of Steubenville in Steubenville, St. John Vianney Seminary, a Camaldolese hermitage, Samaritan House, Catholic Social Services, and St. John's Villa. He also founded the diocesan newspaper, The Steubenville Register. In accord with the Second Vatican Council's reforms, he established the Steubenville Ecumenical Institute to foster better relationships among Christians and Jews. After 33 years as bishop, Mussio retired in 1977.

Auxiliary Bishop Albert Ottenweller of the Diocese of Toledo was appointed bishop of Steubenville on September 27, 1977, by Pope Paul VI. In 1989, Ottenweller was arrested with other protestors outside a  health clinic that provided abortion services for women in Youngstown, Ohio.  Refusing to post bail, he spent six days in jail before his trial. Ottenweiller retired in 1992.

1990 to present 
On January 28, 1992, Auxiliary Bishop Gilbert Sheldon of the Diocese of Cleveland was appointed bishop of the Diocese of Steubenville by Pope John Paul II. Sheldon retired in 2002, to be replaced by Reverend R. Daniel Conlon of the Archdiocese of Cincinnati.

In 2007, Conlon announced that the diocese planned to construct a new Triumph of the Cross Cathedral in Steubenville. Under the plan, the diocese would combine six parishes in the city (Holy Name Cathedral, Holy Rosary, St. Pius X, St. Anthony's, St. Stanislaus, and Servants of Christ the King) into a centrally-located cathedral parish to better accommodate the decreased number of parishioners and priests. The six parishes closed in 2008. However, after raising $8.5 million, Conlon shelved his plan in November 2011, saying that it was far too risky to incur the construction debt.

Pope Benedict XVI name Conlon as bishop of the Diocese of Joliet in 2011 and replaced him in Steubenville with Reverend Jeffrey Monforton of the Archdiocese of Detroit.

In June 2013, Monforton,announced that the diocese would retain the current cathedral and renovate it.  His plan included upgraded technology to allow broadcast of masses and other events, installing security systems to allow 24-hour visitation and restoring the towers that had been were removed in a 1957 renovation.  Monforton added that, whenever possible, the diocese would employ local residents and firms to perform work.  The diocese would also work with nearby Holy Trinity Greek Orthodox Church and the Public Library of Steubenville and Jefferson County to revitalize the neighborhood.

In 2017, the diocese embarked on a year of re-consecration to the Immaculate Heart of Mary, patroness of the diocese.  The diocese formed an 18-person ad hoc task force to ascertain the present pastoral needs of the diocese.  A survey was also shared with all the priests and parishioners.

In May 2018, the diocese discovered that its financial department had been misallocating funds from employee paychecks since 2004.  Monforton started a forensic audit of the diocesan finances dating back to 2004. As a result of the audit. the diocese was forced to pay $3.5 million in employee taxes. The diocese was forced to suspend its plans to renovate Holy Name Cathedral.  Following austerity measures, the diocese balanced its financial standing.  Vicar General Kurt Kemo resigned from his church positions; he was later convicted of felony theft, having stolen over $289,000 from the diocese.

In October 2022, the diocese announced that the Vatican was considering a merger of the diocese with the Diocese of Columbus. A month later, the plan was put on hold.

Sex abuse

On October 31, 2018, the Diocese of Steubenville published a list of 16 clergy and one seminarian who were either credibly accused of, or had admitted, to sexually abusing minors. In November 2018, diocesan priest Henry Foxhoven of Glouster, Ohio pleaded guilty to three counts of sexually battery of a female minor. As a result of his plea agreement, Foxhoven was sentenced to 12 years in prison with no early release. In June 2020, the Vatican defrocked Foxhaven.

In January 2021, Monforton and the diocese were sued for $1 million by Foxhoven's victim. The woman said that Foxhoven impregnated her in 2017 when she was a young teenager attending his church. The suit also stated that an affidavit for a 2018 arrest warrant said that Foxhaven told Monforton that he had been “sexually involved with a juvenile member of his congregation and that she was now pregnant.”  On April 14, 2021, the diocese was dismissed from the lawsuit, leaving Monforton as the defendant.

Bishops

Bishops of Steubenville
 Anthony John King Mussio (1945-1977)
 Albert Henry Ottenweller (1977-1992)
 Gilbert Ignatius Sheldon (1992-2002)
 Robert Daniel Conlon (2002–2011), appointed Bishop of Joliet in Illinois
 Jeffrey Marc Monforton (2012–present)

Other diocesan priest who became a bishop
 Roger Joseph Foys, appointed Bishop of Covington in 2002

Education

High schools
 Catholic Central High School, Steubenville
 St. Joseph Central High School, Ironton

Universities
 Franciscan University of Steubenville, Steubenville

Counties
Counties that make up the Roman Catholic Diocese of Steubenville:
 Athens 
 Belmont 
 Carroll 
 Gallia 
 Guernsey 
 Harrison 
 Jefferson 
 Lawrence 
 Meigs 
 Morgan 
 Monroe 
 Noble 
 Washington

Catholic radio serving the diocese
WILB "Living Bread Radio" 1060 AM in Canton

References

External links 
Roman Catholic Diocese of Steubenville Official Site
Triumph of the Cross Home Page

 
Steubenville
Christian organizations established in 1944
Steubenville, Ohio
Steubenville
1944 establishments in Ohio